The Swedish Business Awards were established in 2006. The project aims to provide positive examples for international establishments and business development by highlighting the success of cooperation, emphasizing innovativeness, outstanding business achievements and the importance of contributions to society. This initiative promotes internationalization of business and serves as a yearly meeting point to discuss achievements, practices and aims. Culmination of the project is the ceremony which includes presentations, discussions and awards for the most successful international and local companies operating in Lithuania, Latvia and Estonia.

The Swedish Business Awards are prestigious event - selected participants are invited, combining representatives from Swedish companies, top executives and opinion leaders on National business stage and top politicians. In addition to this, in 2014 in Estonia awards were handed by Crown Princess of Sweden Victoria, while in 2015 in Lithuania by HM King Carl XVI Gustaf.

Sustainable event

In 2015, celebrating 10th anniversary, Swedish Business Awards became the first sustainable event in Lithuania, organized in accordance with the requirements of ISO 20121:2012 standards. ISO 20121:2012 Event Sustainability Management System standard is applicable for any type of event or event-related activity and to any organization that wishes to establish, implement, maintain or improve an event sustainability management system. In order to offset the direct and unavoidable carbon emissions from this event organization, the organizers of the awards planted around 5 thousand trees in Lithuanian forests.

Organization
The project was initiated in 2006 by four organizations:
Embassy of Sweden in Lithuania
The Swedish Trade & Invest Council - Business Sweden
Swedbank (previously called Hansabankas)
TeliaSonera

The main sponsors and partners of the event:
 Teo
 Valiunas Ellex
 Volvo Trucks
 Ericsson
Delfi
 The Swedish Institute
 Enterprise Estonia
 Investment and Development Agency of Latvia
 Swedish Chamber of Commerce in Estonia
 Swedish Chamber of Commerce in Latvia
The Swedish Trade & Invest Council takes an active role in implementation, while other organizations are active in strategic guidance and implementation of specific aspects.

In 2016, Swedish Business Awards will focus on Technology & Innovation as the key topic of the event.

The event in Lithuania will take place at the Center for Physical Sciences and Technology, Vilnius, on 29 September 2016.

Swedish Business Awards in Latvia are planned to take place at National Library of Latvia, on 13 October 2016.

In Estonia, award ceremony is planned to take place on 18 of October, 2016 at Kumu Art Museum.

Nominations
The awards ceremony honors most successful companies in the following nominations:

Sustainable Growth Award
Criteria: harmonious development of the company - turnover growth with positive results during previous year and contributions to environmental and social sustainability. 
Limitation: only companies operating in Lithuania for at least 3 years are to be considered as candidates.

Corporate social responsibility
Note: In 2011 "Corporate Social Responsibility" nomination name was updated to "Corporate Social Responsibility Initiative of the Year".

Criteria: the most relevant contribution to the development of society in Lithuania.
The Swedish Business Awards wish to promote and strengthen the Corporate Social Responsibility (CSR) commitment among corporations. There is a need for greater awareness about CSR and the Swedish Business Awards would like to be a part of that process. The award is an important step to raise the CSR awareness and to attract attention to excellent examples of CSR projects carried out by companies in Lithuania.
For this award, the Decision Committee is looking for the organization that can best demonstrate a company-wide commitment to Corporate Social Responsibility (CSR). The Decision Committee is looking for evidence of a clearly articulated and widely communicated CSR strategy embedded in the company's business strategy, together with examples of policies or projects that positively impact on the society in terms of the environment, employment, education and charitable work.

Young Entrepreneur of the Year
Criteria: entrepreneurs under 35 years of age, with good reputation, inspiring and sustainable business that makes an impact to the market or society at large.
The nomination was introduced in 2010.

Technological Innovation of the Year
Criteria: the most remarkable technological innovation that was implemented during 2014 or 2015. The technological innovation can be related to all aspects of the company's or organization's activities: new services, products, or work policies and approaches. 
The nomination was introduced in Estonia, in 2015.

Discontinued/Updated nominations

Fastest growing Swedish company
Criteria: the highest turnover growth as measured in per cent. 
Limitation: only Swedish-owned companies can apply for this nomination. 
Only Swedish owned companies operating in Lithuania, Latvia or Estonia for full 3 years can be considered as candidates in the “Fastest growing Swedish company in Lithuania” nomination category. The award is given to organization that demonstrated the highest annual turnover growth. 
In 2011 "Fastest growing Swedish company" nomination was replaced by "Sustainable Growth Award".

Innovator of the Year
Criteria: the most notable innovations in terms of new services, products, or work policies and approaches introduced during the previous year.
An openness to new ways of thinking requires curiosity as well as a strong drive and courage to create new rules. The drive comes from an ambition to change, a desire to create and a longing for what feels new. Innovativeness also requires daring to believe in a better future that leads to crossing borders and innovative results. 
The Swedish Business Awards wishes to encourage innovativeness by emphasizing creativity and braveness to break traditional boundaries. The innovation can be related to all aspects of the company's or organization's activities: new services, products, or work policies and approaches.
In 2010 "The Innovator of the Year" nomination was replaced by "The Young Entrepreneur of the Year".

Hall of fame

Estonia

Sustainable Growth Award:
 Coffee People, 2016
 ETS NORD, 2015
 Greencarrier Freight Services Estonia OÜ, 2014
Trelleborg, 2013
 Palmse Mehaanikakoda OÜ, 2012
 Põltsamaa Felix, 2011

Fastest growing Swedish company (updated to Sustainable Growth Award in 2011):
 AQ Lasertool, 2010
 Netlead, 2009

Corporate Social Responsibility Initiative of the Year:* Swedbank, 2013
 Microsoft Estonia, Mobile Spring, 2015
 ISS Eesti AS, 2014
Rimi Eesti Food AS, 2012
 Entrum, 2011
 Law Firm Sorainen, 2010
ABB, 2009

Young Entrepreneur of the Year:
 Mr. Kristjan Lind, CEO and Co-Founder of Bikeep, 2016
 Ms. Gerli Veermäe, Goworkabit Estonia, 2015
 Mr. Jevgeni Kabanov, 2014 
 Mr. Indrek Rebane, Hedgehog OÜ, 2012
 Ms. Lilli Jahilo, 2011
 Ms. Anni Arro, 2010

Innovator of the Year (updated to Young Entrepreneur of the Year in 2010:
 Reklaamilahenduse, 2009

Technology for the Social Progress Award (only in 2013):
TeliaSonera

Technological Innovation of the Year Award:
 Competence Centre on Health Technologies, 2016
 Skeleton Technologies, 2015

Latvia

Technological Innovation of the Year Award:
 Mr. Reinis Ādamsons, RORBO, 2016

Sustainable Growth Award:
 Baltic Candles, 2016
 Dinair Filton, 2015
 Dobeles Dzirnavnieks AS, 2014
 Trelleborg, 2013
 Livonia Print, 2012
Valmieras Stikla Šķiedra, 2011

Fastest growing Swedish company (updated to Sustainable Growth in 2011):
 Gateway Baltic, 2010
SDI Media Latvia, 2009

Corporate Social Responsibility Initiative of the Year:
Rimi Latvia, 2015
 Rimi Latvia, 2014
Swedbank, 2013
Lattelecom, 2012
 Wooly World, 2011
 Krāsu Serviss and Vairāk Saules, 2010
CEMEX, 2009

Young Entrepreneur of the Year:
 Ms. Linda Sinka and Ms. Elīna Ingelande, Learn IT, 2016
 Ms. Andra Katkeviča and Ms. Līga Elmane, Gusto SIA, 2015
 Mr. Mikus Opelts, Giraffe Visualization Group SIA, 2014
Erenpreiss Original, Toms Ērenpreiss and Viesturs Masteiko, 2012
 Mr. Krišs Spūlis, 2011
 INTEA, Mr. R.Freimanis, 2010

Innovator of the Year (updated to Young Entrepreneur of the Year in 2010):
 Groglass, 2008

Technology for the Social Progress Award (only in 2013):
 TeliaSonera

Lithuania
Technological Innovation of the Year Award:
 prof. dr. Virginijus Šikšnys, 2016

Sustainable Growth Award:
 LT Technologies, 2016
 Enerstena, 2015
 Light Conversion, 2014
 Trelleborg, 2013
 Baldai Jums, 2012
 Altechna, 2011

Fastest growing Swedish company (updated to Sustainable Growth in 2011):
 Systemair, 2010
 Trelleborg Engineered Systems Lithuania, 2009
 ViaCon Baltic, 2008
 Swecon, 2007
 Maxit, 2006

Corporate Social Responsibility Initiative of the Year:
 LESTO, Sustainable School Initiative, 2015
 Project "Connecting Woman", 2014
 Swedbank, 2013
 Servico, Green office, 2012
 The National Student Academy, 2011
 Rimi, 2010
AVON Cosmetics, 2009
MTV Networks Baltic, 2008
 SEB Vilniaus Bankas (together with the Lithuanian Children's Foundation), 2007
 TEO LT, 2006

Young Entrepreneur of the Year:
 Mr. Mantas Vizbaras, Mr. Martynas Gudonavičius, Mr. Algimantas Krasauskas, Mr. Jurgis Pašukonis, TRAFI, 2016
 Dr. Austėja Landsbergienė, Vaikystės Sodas, 2015
 Mr. Aurelijus Liubinas, Friday Lab, 2014
 Kristijonas, Augustinas and Dominykas Vizbaras, Brolis Semiconductors, 2012
 Mr. Karolis Verbliugevičius, 2011
 Mr. Daumantas Mikučionis, 2010

Innovator of the Year (updated to Young Entrepreneur of the Year in 2010):
 Sicor Biotech, 2008
Gambro Healthcare Lietuva, 2007
Omnitel, 2006

Business IQ of the Year (only in 2012):
Ekspla

Technology for the Social Progress Award (only in 2013):
 TeliaSonera

External links
 www.swedishbusinessawards.com  - Official web-site

Founding Partners:
 www.swedenabroad.com  - Embassy of Sweden in Lithuania
 www.business-sweden.se/ - Swedish Trade & Invest Council
 www.swedbank.lt  - Swedbank
 www.teliasonera.com  - TeliaSonera
 www.teo.lt - Teo
 www.valiunasellex.lt/ - Valiunas Ellex
 www.delfi.lt - Delfi Lithuania
 www.delfi.lv - Delfi Latvia
 www.delfi.ee - Delfi Estonia
 https://si.se/ - The Swedish Institute
 http://www.volvotrucks.ee/ - Volvo Trucks
 https://www.ericsson.com/ - Ericsson
 http://www.eas.ee/?lang=en - Enterprise Estonia
 http://www.liaa.gov.lv/en - Investment and Development Agency of Latvia
 http://www.swedishchamber.ee/ - Swedish Chamber of Commerce in Estonia
 http://www.scc.lv/ - Swedish Chamber of Commerce in Latvia

Economy of Sweden-related lists